Dillian Whyte vs Óscar Rivas was a heavyweight professional boxing match contested between Dillian Whyte and Óscar Rivas for the vacant WBC interim heavyweight title. The event took place on 20 July 2019 at The O2 Arena in London. After the fight, it was reported that Dillian Whyte tested positive for a substance banned by UK-Anti Doping (UKAD) during training for the fight. However, UKAD released a statement in December 2019, fully exonerating Whyte of any wrong-doing.

Background 

Following his eleventh-round knockout victory over Derek Chisora, Whyte called out unified heavyweight champion Anthony Joshua. Joshua, who was unusually booed by many of those present at The O2 Arena, said: “If Deontay Wilder is serious and he is going to fight Tyson Fury and doesn’t want to become undisputed champion, Dillian, you will get a title shot." On 12 January 2019, Whyte revealed that he had turned down a "severe lowball" offer from Joshua to fight him in a rematch. Whyte did not reveal the figure, however, he claimed it was lower than what he received against Chisora in December 2018.

Whyte claimed the Joshua fight "was dead" and he was to look at other options, including a potential fight with Dominic Breazeale for the interim WBC belt but Breazeale challenged Deontay Wilder for the world title.

NABF, IBF International, and WBO-NABO champion Rivas, had enhanced his reputation as a danger man following his brutal knockout of the former world title challenger Bryant Jennings in January.

The fight
Whyte survived a ninth-round knockdown to take a unanimous decision victory, with two of the judge's scorecards showing 115-112, and the third 116-111.

Aftermath
Three days after the bout it was revealed that Whyte tested positive for a substance that is banned by UK-Anti Doping (UKAD) during the pre-fight training, but also gave negative results on all tests administered by the Voluntary Anti Doping Association. His promoter Eddie Hearn urged fans to "wait for the facts" before judging the fighter. In the same month, upon hearing the news of the adverse findings, the WBC provisionally suspended Whyte's interim champion status and removed him from their rankings pending an investigation. On 6 December 2019, UKAD released a statement fully exonerating Whyte of any wrong-doing, stating; "UK Anti-Doping and the professional boxer, Dillian Whyte, can today jointly confirm that Mr Whyte was charged with an anti-doping rule violation (ADRV) earlier this year, but that this charge has now been withdrawn. The charge was brought after a sample provided by Mr Whyte on 20 June 2019 indicated the presence of two metabolites of a steroid. UKAD initiated an investigation with which Mr Whyte cooperated fully. UKAD has accepted the explanation provided by Mr Whyte and, in accordance with the UK Anti-Doping Rules, the charge against Mr Whyte has been withdrawn."

Fight card

References

2019 in boxing
Boxing in London
2019 in British sport
July 2019 sports events in the United Kingdom
2019 sports events in London
International sports competitions in London
Boxing matches